Firsdown is a civil parish in Wiltshire, England,  northeast of Salisbury.

Before the 1950s the area was sparsely populated downland within the parish of Winterbourne. By 1976 housing estates had been built on both sides of Firs Road, which links Winterslow with the A30. The civil parish of Firsdown was created in 1986.

The parish includes the Figsbury Ring, a biological Site of Special Scientific Interest which contains prehistoric earthworks.

References

External links

 / Firsdown Parish Council

Villages in Wiltshire
Civil parishes in Wiltshire